Arshdeep Singh (born 5 February 1999) is an  Indian professional cricketer, who plays for India national cricket team in international cricket. In Indian domestic cricket, he plays for Punjab in First–class, List A, T20s and for Punjab Kings in Indian Premier League. Singh is a left-arm medium fast bowler and left-handed lower order batter.

He made his international debut for the Indian team in T20I, in July 2022 versus England. Singh primarily plays as a medium fast bowler and is notable for his death over bowling in which he uses yorkers.

Early life 
Arshdeep Sigh was born in a Sikh family to Darshan Singh and Baljit Kaur at Guna Madhya Pradesh, where his father was posted in Central Industrial Security Force (CISF). His father worked in CISF for more than 25 years. Later Singh's family shifted to Kharar, near Chandigarh, where Singh now live with his family. Darshan Singh now works as a security head in Groz Beckert Asia inside Industrial Area of Chandigarh. He started playing gully cricket with neighborhood boys and later joined Jaswant Rai's cricket academy, Chandigarh in 2015. His elder brother Akashdeep Singh lives in Brampton, Canada.

Domestic career
As of 5 October 2022, Arshdeep Singh has played for India under-19, India under-23, Punjab, Punjab kings teams and for Indian men's national cricket team in T20Is.

In junior cricket he played in Katoch Shield tournament. He was part of Indian under 19 cricket team who won 2018 Under-19 Cricket World Cup.

In 2018, he played for Punjab under-23 cricket team in CK Nayudu Trophy. In the tournament playing against Rajasthan, he took 8 wickets including a hat-trick in Rajasthan's second inning and 10 wickets in that match.

Singh made his List A debut for Punjab in the 2018–19 Vijay Hazare Trophy on 19 September 2018. Prior to his List A debut, he was named in India's squad for the 2018 Under-19 Cricket World Cup.

Mumbai Indians and Kings XI Punjab had called him for trials.

In December 2018, he was bought by the Kings XI Punjab in the player auction for the 2019 Indian Premier League. He made his Twenty20 debut for Kings XI Punjab in the 2019 Indian Premier League on 16 April 2019. He finished as the team's second-highest wicket-taker  and has been lauded for his good performances.  In November 2019, he was named in India's squad for the 2019 ACC Emerging Teams Asia Cup in Bangladesh. He made his first-class debut on 25 December 2019, for Punjab in the 2019–20 Ranji Trophy.

In  Syed Mushtaq Ali Trophy 2021 he played for Punjab.

In June 2021, he was named as one of five net bowlers for India's tour of Sri Lanka. Following a positive case for COVID-19 in the Indian team, Singh was added to India's main squad for their final two Twenty20 International (T20I) matches of the tour. In May 2022, Singh was named in India's T20I squad for their series against South Africa. The following month, he was named in India's T20I squad for their two-match series against Ireland.

International career
In June 2022, Singh was named in India's One Day International (ODI) and T20I squads for their tour of England. In July 2022, he was again named in India's ODI squad, this time for their away series against the West Indies. He made his T20I debut on 7 July 2022, for India against England. In a 2022 series against West Indies he picked seven wickets in five matches with a 16.14 bowling average and was named player of the series.

On 8 August 2022, he was named in India's squad for the Asia Cup.

In October 2022, he was named in India's squad for the Series against Sauth Africa, he picked 5 wickets in 2 matches with an bowling average of 18,80

In September, He was named in India's squad for the 2022 ICC T20 World Cup, In first match against Pakistan he picked 3/32 wickets in 4 overs, He was the highest wicket taker for team India, he picked 10 wickets in 6 matches with an bowling average of 15,60

In November 2022, Arshdeep made his ODI debut against New Zealand.

References

External links
 
 

1999 births
Living people
Indian cricketers
India Twenty20 International cricketers
Punjab Kings cricketers
Punjab, India cricketers